ATI TruForm was a brand by ATI (now AMD) for a SIP block capable of doing a graphics procedure called tessellation in computer hardware. ATI TruForm was included into Radeon 8500 (available from August 2001 on) and newer products.

The successor of the SIP block branded "ATI TruForm" was included into Radeon HD 2000 series (available from June 2007 on) and newer products: hardware tessellation with TeraScale.

Support for hardware tessellation only became mandatory in Direct3D 11 and OpenGL 4. Tessellation as defined in those APIs is only supported by newer TeraScale 2 (VLIW5) products introduced in September 2009 and GCN-based products (available from January 2012 on). The GCN SIP block carrying out the tessellation is the "Geometric processor".

Overview 
Before the adoption of pixel shader-enhanced bump mapping methods such as normal and parallax mapping that simulate higher mesh detail, curved 3D shapes in games were created with large numbers of triangles. The more triangles are used, the more detailed and thus less polygonal the surface appears. TruForm creates a curved surface using the existing triangles, and tessellates this surface to make a new, more detailed polygonal model. It is designed to increase visual quality, without significantly impacting frame rates, by utilizing hardware processing of geometry.

TruForm was not significantly accepted by game developers because it ideally required the models to be designed with TruForm in mind. To enable the feature without causing visual problems, such as ballooned-up weapons, the models had to have flags identifying which areas were to be tessellated. The lack of industry-wide support of the technique from the competition caused developers to ignore the technology.

In later version of Catalyst drivers, the TruForm feature is removed.

Beginning with Radeon X1000 series, TruForm was no longer advertised as a hardware feature.  However, Radeon 9500 and higher (as well as hardware supporting Shader Model 3.0) include Render to Vertex Buffer feature, which can be used for tessellation applications. In the case of Radeon X1000 series, it supports binding up to 5 R2VB buffers
simultaneously. Tessellation as dedicated hardware has returned in Xenos and Radeon R600 GPUs.

Games with TruForm support 
Counter-Strike (ati_subdiv "2.0", ati_npatch "1.0")
Tom Clancy's Rainbow Six
Soldier of Fortune
Soldier of Fortune II: Double Helix
Quake (TruQuake Patch)
Quake 2 (TruQuake2 Patch)
Hexen II (TruHexen2 Patch, edit of the TruQuake2 Patch) (developed by RaVeN )
Unreal Tournament (TruUT Patch)
The Elder Scrolls III: Morrowind (unofficially, with the FPS Optimizer)
Madden NFL 2004
Bugdom
Return to Castle Wolfenstein
Serious Sam
Unreal Tournament 2003 and 2004 (must edit the game's ".ini" file and set "UseNPatches=True")
Wolfenstein: Enemy Territory
Command & Conquer: Renegade
Neverwinter Nights (must edit the game's ".ini" file and set "Enable Truform=1")
FTEQW (Quake World, Net Quake, Quake II, Quake, Quake III: Arena, Hexen 2, Nexuiz)  
Quake III Arena  (developed by RaVeN )

References

External links
Official ATI's List of TruForm Enabled Game Titles
ATI Press release
ATI TruForm Developer FAQ page
TruForm whitepaper
R2VB Programming (March 2006)
Render to Vertex Buffer with D3D9
area3d.net: NitroGL Demos - home of TruQuake, TruQuake2 & TruUT

3D rendering
ATI Technologies